Ivo Heuberger (born 19 February 1976) is a retired tennis player who represented Switzerland at the Davis Cup.

Early life
Ivo Heuberger was born in the small town of Altstätten, Switzerland on 19 February 1976. He began his tennis career after moving to the French part of Switzerland to attend the National Training Center. He showed promise during his junior days and was eager to begin his professional debut.

Tennis career
Ivo turned pro in 1997. He won his first title in India at a small $25,000 Challenger, beating Danai Udomchoke 6–2, 6–3.
Ivo was chosen to represent Switzerland along with the rest of the Swiss Davis Cup team 7 times during his career.

His career was one that had few highlights and perhaps he was best known in the tennis world for his relationship with former world #1 Martina Hingis. His best ranking was 102, and he remained in the 100s for much of his career. He is what most in the tennis world would call a "journeyman"—one who spends much of their career on the Challenger circuit and in ATP qualifying draws.

Perhaps his most notable win was his defeat of Roger Federer in qualifying at the 1999 US Open. Ivo defeated the then 18-year-old Federer in the second round of qualifying in straight sets. Never again, in the ensuing 21 years, would Roger fail to advance to the main draw of a Grand Slam tournament.

Business career
Ivo began putting to use the many contacts he had made over the years while traveling to 60 different countries. He founded a company called Hi-Pro in the summer of 2004. His company specializes in marketing and promotional products and has since grown to be one of the biggest companies in its field in Switzerland. In 2006, Ivo Heuberger and the Swiss Tennis team federation signed a deal that would make Hi-Pro the official clothing provider for the Swiss Davis Cup Team. Hi-Pro now also provides the official staff uniforms for the Basel Swiss Indoor Tennis Tournament.

Personal life
In September 2007, Ivo married Martha Dominguez who is a Miami-based fashion blogger.
He currently splits his time between Zurich and Miami Beach with his wife and two children.
Both of his children are avid golfers and compete in the junior circuit.

References

External links
 Hi-Pro - Homepage
 
 
 

1976 births
Hopman Cup competitors
Living people
Swiss male tennis players
People from Altstätten
Sportspeople from the canton of St. Gallen